Pappu is a 1980 Indian Malayalam-language film, directed by Baby and produced by Raghu Kumar. The film stars Prathap Pothen, Seema, Sukumari and Jagathy Sreekumar. The film has musical score by K. J. Joy.

Cast
Prathap Pothen
Seema
Sukumari
Jagathy Sreekumar
Prathapachandran
M. G. Soman
Kaviyoor Ponnamma
Adoor Bhasi
Sreelatha Namboothiri
Ravikumar
Ravi

Soundtrack
The music was composed by K. J. Joy.

References

External links
 

1980 films
1980s Malayalam-language films
Films scored by K. J. Joy
Films directed by Baby (director)